JSCI may refer to :

 Job Seeker Classification Instrument
 JSci, a science API for Java
 Journal of Systemics, Cybernetics and Informatics
 Japanese Standards of Cosmetic Ingredients
 Japan Society for Clinical Immunology